Tyrone is a town in northeastern Texas County, Oklahoma, United States. The population was 762 at the 2010 census.

Geography

Demographics

As of the census of 2000, there were 880 people, 324 households, and 243 families residing in the town. There were 374 housing units at an average density of 909.4 per square mile (352.2/km2). The racial makeup of the town was 77.39% White, 0.34% African American, 0.57% Native American, 0.11% Asian, 18.64% from other races, and 2.95% from two or more races. Hispanic or Latino of any race were 23.52% of the population.

There were 324 households, out of which 40.7% had children under the age of 18 living with them, 60.8% were married couples living together, 10.5% had a female householder with no husband present, and 25.0% were non-families. 21.6% of all households were made up of individuals, and 5.6% had someone living alone who was 65 years of age or older. The average household size was 2.72 and the average family size was 3.18.

In the town, the population was spread out, with 31.1% under the age of 18, 9.8% from 18 to 24, 30.5% from 25 to 44, 21.4% from 45 to 64, and 7.3% who were 65 years of age or older. The median age was 31 years. For every 100 females, there were 97.8 males. For every 100 females age 18 and over, there were 98.7 males.

The median income for a household in the town was $33,550, and the median income for a family was $37,500. Males had a median income of $28,438 versus $20,156 for females. The per capita income for the town was $12,826. About 6.0% of families and 8.9% of the population were below the poverty line, including 9.1% of those under age 18 and 12.1% of those age 65 or over.

History

The town was reportedly named by a railway vice president when the railroad passed through the area. It was named after Tyrone, Pennsylvania, where the V.P.'s mother lived. The towns on the railway in Texas County (see below) were 10 miles apart, either for the distance between railroad worker camps, or because of needs for water by locomotives at that distance apart. Nearby Shades Well (three miles northeast) was the trailhead for many cattle drives in the late 19th century. It was larger than Dodge City for a time, and still has mounds of broken glass from beer and whisky bottles consumed by drovers.  The trailhead later moved again and it was abandoned.

Transportation
Tyrone is on U.S. Route 54, northeast of Hooker and southwest of Liberal, Kansas.

Commercial air transportation is available at Liberal Mid-America Regional Airport in Kansas, approximately 11 miles northeast.

References

Towns in Texas County, Oklahoma
Towns in Oklahoma
Oklahoma Panhandle